100 Montgomery Street, also known as the Equitable Life Building, is an office tower located in the financial district of San Francisco, California. The , 25-floor tower was completed in 1955 and served as headquarters to the Equitable Life Insurance Company.

Designed by William Peugh, 100 Montgomery Street is one of the first post-World War II office buildings in San Francisco, distinguished by classical white marble facade against aluminum art-deco window framing. Hines and Sterling sold the building to EQ Office, an affiliate of The Blackstone Group LP, for US$165 million in October 2012, who in turn sold it for a reported $285 million to the Vanbarton Group and a pension fund partner in 2016.

Tenants 
 Epsilon
 Arcadis
 Blend Labs
 BrightTALK
 City National Bank
 HealthMarkets
 RunawayTours
 Snapfish
 Talener Group LLC
 The Segal Company
 Trinity Life Sciences
 United States General Services Administration
 Veeva Systems
 Wells Fargo Bank

See also
 San Francisco's tallest buildings

References

Office buildings completed in 1955
Skyscraper office buildings in San Francisco
Financial District, San Francisco
1955 establishments in California